{{Infobox football biography
| name           = Alberto Michelotti
| image          = Alberto Michelotti (1975).jpg
| caption        = Michelotti in 1975
| birth_date     = 
| birth_place    = Parma, Italy
| death_date     = 
| death_place    =
| position       = Goalkeeper
| youthyears1    = 1945–1946
| youthclubs1    = Giovane Italia
| youthyears2    = 1946–1947
| youthclubs2    = Parma
| youthyears3    = 1948–1949
| youthclubs3    = Parma
| years1         = 1947–1948
| clubs1         = Parma Vecchia
| caps1          =
| goals1         =
| years2         = 1949–1950
| clubs2         = Borgotarese
| caps2          = 11
| goals2         = 0
| years3         = 1950–1952
| clubs3         = Colorno
| caps3          =
| goals3         =
| years4         = 1952–1953
| clubs4         = Fidenza
| caps4          =
| goals4         =
| years5         = 1953–1954
| clubs5         = Folgore Piaden
| caps5          =
| goals5         =
| years6         = 1954–1955
| clubs6         = Bozzolese
| caps6          =
| goals6         =
| module         = 
}}

Alberto Michelotti (15 July 1930 – 18 January 2022) was an Italian football player and referee.

Career
Michelotti began his career in football as a goalkeeper, before becoming a referee in Serie A in 1967. In 1973, Michelotti was appointed a FIFA referee.

At club level, Michelotti officiated the 1975 Coppa Italia Final between Fiorentina and Milan in Rome on 28 June; the former side won the match 3–2. He was also in charge of refereeing the second leg of the 1979 UEFA Cup Final between Borussia Mönchengladbach and Red Star Belgrade, on 23 May, which ended in a 1–0 home victory to the former club, which in turn saw the German side claim the title 2–1 on aggregate.

The following season, he also officiated the 1980 Coppa Italia Final between Roma and Torino in Rome on 17 May, which ended in 3–2 penalty shoot-out victory to the former team following a 0–0 draw after extra-time. He officiated the third Coppa Italia final of his career in the following year, against the same two opponents, the second leg of a 1–1 draw on 17 June, in Turin; following a 2–2 aggregate draw after extra-time, Roma once again prevailed on penalties, winning 4–2.

At international level, in 1976, Michelotti was appointed a referee for the 1976 Summer Olympics, where he officiated two matches. Four years later, Michelotti was appointed a referee for UEFA Euro 1980, where he officiated a group stage match between Czechoslovakia and West Germany. Michelotti retired from officiating in 1981.

Personal life and death
Michelotti died on 18 January 2022, at the age of 91.

Honours
Italian Football Hall of Fame: 2019

References

External links
 
 
 

1930 births
2022 deaths
Sportspeople from Parma
Italian footballers
Association football goalkeepers
Parma Calcio 1913 players
Italian football referees
UEFA Euro 1980 referees
Footballers from Emilia-Romagna